The 2010–11 Missouri Tigers men's basketball team represented the University of Missouri in the 2010-11 NCAA Division I men's basketball season. Their Head Coach was Mike Anderson, who was in his 5th year at Missouri. The team played its home games at Mizzou Arena in Columbia, Missouri and they are members of the Big 12 Conference. They finished the season 23–11, 8–8 in Big 12 play and lost in the quarterfinals of the 2011 Big 12 men's basketball tournament to Texas A&M. They received an at-large bid in the 2011 NCAA Division I men's basketball tournament where they lost in the second round to Cincinnati.

In March, rumors began to swirl that Anderson would pursue a job after the season at the University of Arkansas, where he spent 17 years as an assistant coach to Nolan Richardson. Anderson quickly dismissed the talk, telling Columbia Tribune beat writer Steve Walentik he planned to coach at Missouri "for a long time, retire here."   However, later in the month, Anderson accepted a job at Arkansas. Missouri subsequently hired Frank Haith, who finished 43-69 in ACC play as the head coach at Miami from 2004 to 2011.

Roster

Schedule 

|-
!colspan=12 style=|Preseason

|-
!colspan=12 style=|Non-conference regular season

|-
!colspan=12 style=|Big 12 regular season

 
 

|-
!colspan=12 style=|Big 12 tournament 

|-
!colspan=12 style=|NCAA tournament

References 

Missouri
Missouri Tigers men's basketball seasons
Missouri
Tiger
Tiger